Trans people may refer to:

Transgender people, a broad term to refer to people who have a gender identity or gender expression that differs from their sex assigned at birth
Transsexual people, a subset of transgender people whose assigned sex at birth conflicts with their psychological gender